Supa Doopa Remix is the fourth release by Les Georges Leningrad. It was released April 12, 2005 by Troubleman Unlimited.

Track listing
 "Supa Doopa (Les Georges Leningrad Version Originale)	"
 "Supa Doopa (Akufen Soutien-Georges Remix)"
 "Supa Doopa (Magas Remix)"
 "Supa Doopa (Ghislain Poirier Remix)"
 "Mein Name Ist Eva Brown"

External links
Les Georges Leningrad official website
Supa Doopa Remix at Amazon.com

Les Georges Leningrad albums
2005 EPs
2005 remix albums
Remix EPs